Love, Sidney is an American sitcom television series which aired two seasons on NBC, from October 28, 1981, to June 6, 1983. It stars Tony Randall as Sidney Shorr (a single, closeted gay man), Swoosie Kurtz as Laurie Morgan (a single mother with whom he shares his home), and Kaleena Kiff as Patricia "Patti" Morgan (Laurie's young daughter). It was the first program on American television to feature a gay character as the central character, although his sexual orientation was carefully downplayed for most of the series' duration.

The series was based on a short story by Marilyn Cantor Baker, which was adapted as the TV movie Sidney Shorr: A Girl's Best Friend, which NBC aired a few weeks before the series premiered. It was produced by Warner Bros. Television.

Synopsis
The storyline begins with the television movie Sidney Shorr: A Girl's Best Friend. Randall plays the title character, a well-to-do gay New Yorker in his 50s, who befriends a single woman, Laurie Morgan (originally played by Lorna Patterson) and Patti, her young daughter. Laurie is an aspiring actress, and at the end of the movie, Sidney is brokenhearted when she and Patti move to California. Patti is played in the later stages of the movie (once time lapses to her being five years old) by Kaleena Kiff, who retains the role in Love, Sidney.

With the debut of the series, Laurie Morgan (now played by Swoosie Kurtz) and Patti return to New York, following the failure of Laurie's marriage in California. The three characters return to sharing Sidney's Manhattan apartment. Laurie has established herself as an actress in commercials and television roles, and resumes her career in New York, appearing as vixen "Gloria Trenell" on the (fictional) daytime soap opera As Thus We Are. Sidney continues to be a doting father figure to precocious Patti, whose innocence fills his life with sunshine, and provides him with the child he has never had.

Although it is openly acknowledged in the TV movie that Sidney was gay, and had previously been in a relationship with a man, in the series these facts are not stated directly. Instead his sexual orientation is ambiguous and only hinted at, and the "couple" of Laurie and Sidney behave platonically, with only fleeting displays of affection that might be interpreted as romantic.

Sidney speaks at times about his long deceased mother, consistently referring to her as "that terrible woman".

The series depicts Sidney's career as a professional illustrator; his frequent business deals are made with young ad agency director Jason Stoller (Chip Zien), who works at Graham & Ludwig, Sidney's biggest account. Another recurring character in the first season is Sidney's friend and neighbor judge Mort Harris (Alan North), who had a dog named “Rehnquist”—-named for then-Associate U.S. Supreme Court Justice William Rehnquist. In the second season, their most prominent neighbor is busybody Mrs. Gaffney (Barbara Bryne), wife of the building's superintendent, who seeks to gain Sidney's affections. Also added to the cast that season is Nancy (Lynne Thigpen), Jason's secretary at Graham & Ludwig.

Production
Sidney Shorr: A Girl's Best Friend went into production during 1980. Network executives planned to use it as a pilot, and develop the movie into a weekly series if it was a success in the ratings. However, after the film was complete, NBC continued to postpone its premiere, and by the end of the 1980–81 season it had not yet aired. Meanwhile, the network had decided to produce the series as part of its 1981 Fall schedule, using the movie as an introduction shortly before its debut.

By the time the series was cast, Lorna Patterson was no longer available, as she had already begun starring on CBS' Private Benjamin; Swoosie Kurtz took over the role of Laurie Morgan. Tony Randall, bitter about regular television roles after the cancellation of his last series The Tony Randall Show (1976–78), was initially uninterested in returning to a television series, but was interested in the "Sidney Shorr" story as a TV movie.  Randall agreed to Love, Sidney with two conditions. First, it would provide him extra income that would go toward the financing of the national theatre he wanted to open and run in New York City. (The salary he made over the show's two seasons eventually paid off when his National Actors Theatre opened at NYC's Pace University in 1991.) Secondly, the series had to be taped in New York. During the first season, the series was produced at Reeves Teletape Studios, though the first episode was recorded in Studio 6A at NBC Studios (New York City). Midway through season one, production of Love, Sidney was forced to relocate to Los Angeles for seven episodes because the Teletape studios needed to honor a previous commitment to another production. Those seven episodes were recorded at Warner Bros. in Burbank. Love, Sidney returned to New York for the remainder of its run, taping in various studios, including the CBS Broadcast Center despite being an NBC series.

When the series was announced, NBC received complaints from the Moral Majority and other special-interest groups who were upset about the network presenting a positive portrayal of homosexuality. The lead character's sexuality was kept ambiguous, referred to only in oblique, coded hints. Some TV critics described the character only as a "confirmed bachelor".

The series proved popular among viewers in New York City, where the series was set, particular with its gay male population. The show was also popular in Chicago, Los Angeles, San Francisco, and Seattle. In other markets, however, its ratings ranged from moderately successful to poor.

George Eckstein was the original executive producer from the time of Love, Sidneys premiere. While the series performed well enough for NBC to warrant it a second season, they pushed for changes in order to improve the show's chances for lasting success. At the start of the 1982–83 season, the network hired the veteran producing team of Rod Parker and Hal Cooper to take over the show. With existing producers Ken Hecht and Sandy Veith, they made many changes, including two new regular cast members and a switch to more meaningful, moralized stories which bordered on the "very special episode" format.

The first eight episodes of the second season featured a remixed version of the theme song, sung by Gladys and Bubba Knight. With the November 27, 1982 episode ("Jan, Part 1"), the original version of the theme was reinstated for the title sequence, while the closing credits retained the outro track recorded by the Knights.

As time went on, the writers began to set things up to address Sidney's orientation more directly. The addition of the female neighbor Mrs. Gaffney pursuing a sexual relationship with him offered more opportunities to establish that he was not attracted to women.

In a special hour-long episode aired on May 16, 1983, Sidney agrees to date his new co-worker Allison (Martha Smith), but the courtship ends because of Sidney's lack of passion. He explains that his heart had been broken by a previous long-time love, and he could never love anyone again. Left alone, Allison tearfully remarks about Sidney's former lover: "if only she knew what she was missing", and the camera pans over to a framed photograph of Sidney's former lover Martin, from the pilot movie.

The following episode, the next-to-last in the series, has an openly gay guest character: a psychiatrist who befriends Sidney after the latter talks him out of suicide.

The series was not renewed for a third season.

Broadcast history

US TV Ratings

Episodes
 Nº = Overall episode number
 Ep = Episode number by season
 (s) = Story
 (t)' = Teleplay

Season 1: 1981–82

Season 2: 1982–83

References

External links

 

1981 American television series debuts
1983 American television series endings
1980s American sitcoms
American LGBT-related sitcoms
English-language television shows
NBC original programming
Television series by Warner Bros. Television Studios
Television shows filmed in New York (state)
Television shows set in New York City